Hook, Line & Sinker is a 1969 American comedy film produced by and starring Jerry Lewis. This was the final film for director George Marshall, whose career dated back to 1916, and Lewis' last film for Columbia Pictures.

Plot
Before undergoing an operation at a hospital in Chile, Peter Ingersoll explains the origin of his unusual condition.

Peter, a California insurance salesman, learns that he only has a short time left to live. With his wife's encouragement, Peter embarks on an epic fishing excursion, accruing $100,000 of charges on his credit card. However, Dr. Carter contacts Peter to inform him that he was misdiagnosed and is not dying. Peter is urged by Dr. Carter to fake his death to avoid paying the large debt and to permit his wife to collect a $150,000 life-insurance policy. After seven years, when the statute of limitations expires, Peter can reappear.

Peter discovers that the entire plan was a scheme concocted by his wife and Dr. Carter, who are having an affair. He is determined to sabotage their plans but instead finds himself on the operating table in Chile with a marlin piercing his chest.

Cast
 Jerry Lewis as Peter Ingersoll / Fred Dobbs 
 Peter Lawford as Dr. Scott Carter
 Anne Francis as Nancy Ingersoll
 Pedro Gonzalez Gonzalez as Perfecto
 Jimmy Miller as Jimmy Ingersoll
 Jennifer Edwards as Jennifer Ingersoll
 Eleanor Audley as Mrs. Durham
 Henry Corden as Kenyon Hammercher
 Sylvia Lewis as Karlotta Hammercher
 Phillip Pine as Head Surgeon
 Felipe Turich as Foreign Mortician
 Kathleen Freeman as Mrs. Hardtack - Baby Sitter

Production
Hook, Line & Sinker was filmed under the working title Kook's Tour.

The film was shot from April 1 to June 20, 1968 at the Columbia Ranch in Burbank using the exterior of the same house seen in the television series Gidget (1965–66). The interior scenes were filmed on the same sound stage that had been used for the television series Bewitched (1964–72), although the color scheme was substantially altered.

Release
Hook, Line & Sinker opened nationwide on April 2, 1969. It was the first Jerry Lewis film released under the MPAA's new film rating system and was assigned a G rating.

Home media
The film was released on DVD on November 6, 2012. It was rereleased on DVD in a Jerry Lewis Triple Feature collection with Three on a Couch (1966) and Don't Raise the Bridge, Lower the River (1968) on January 16, 2018.

Reception 
In a contemporary review for The New York Times, critic Vincent Canby wrote: "[T]here is simply too much of the straight Jerry Lewis, a suburban husband who learns that he has only a few months to live and goes off on a credit card binge. Lewis's all-too evident arrogance and self-assurance are best hidden behind the masks of characters who make no call on pathos."

See also
 List of American films of 1969

References

External links

 
 

1969 films
1969 comedy films
Films directed by George Marshall
Columbia Pictures films
Films produced by Jerry Lewis
1960s English-language films
American comedy films
1960s American films